was a daimyō (warlord) and third head of the Odawara Hōjō clan. Known as the "Lion of Sagami", he was revered as a fearsome warrior and a cunning man. He is famous for his strategies of breaking the siege from Takeda Shingen and Uesugi Kenshin. A son of Hōjō Ujitsuna (北条 氏綱), his only known wife was Imagawa Yoshimoto's sister, Zuikei-in. Among his sons are Hōjō Ujimasa and Uesugi Kagetora.

Early years and rise
Born in 1515, his childhood name was Chiyomaru (千代丸). He fought his first battle when he was fifteen years old, facing Uesugi Tomooki of the Ōgigayatsu Uesugi clan (扇谷上杉家) at the Battle of Ozawahara in 1530.

Upon his father's death in 1541, a number of the Hōjō's enemies sought to take advantage of the opportunity to seize major Hōjō strongholds.

Faced with almost endless warfare, Ujiyasu was compelled to reorganize the administration of the Hōjō lands. He had already ordered a series of aggressive cadastral surveys between 1542 and 1543, and in 1550, he overhauled the Kandaka (ja) taxation system.

Odawara, where his home castle Odawara Castle (小田原城) was located, was gradually transformed into an important trading center by modifying the region's throughways (which were hitherto designed with Kamakura as a hub) and creating an artisan's guild within the castle town. In addition, post stations and market places sprung up throughout the Hôjô's lands. Ujiyasu soon became one of the main powers in the Kantō region.

Conflict with Uesugi
In 1545, Uesugi Tomosada, of the Ōgigayatsu Uesugi clan and the eldest legitimate son of Uesugi Tomooki, attempted to regain Kawagoe Castle for the Uesugi clan. Tomosada allied himself with the Koga Kubo Ashikaga Haruuji (足利 晴氏) and Uesugi Norimasa (上杉 憲政) of the Yamauchi Uesugi clan (山内上杉家) and besieged Kawagoe Castle (Siege of Kawagoe Castle). The castle garrison, led by Hōjō Tsunashige (北条 綱成), the stepson of Ujiyasu's brother Tamemasa (北条 為昌) and son-in-law of Ujitsuna, was outnumbered 3,000 to allegedly 80,000 men. Ujiyasu, leading a relief force of 8,000 soldiers, slipped some samurai past the enemy lines to inform Tsunashige of the enemy's approach, and made use of ninja to learn of the enemy's strategy and attitude. Using this intelligence, he led a night attack against the Ashikaga-Uesugi forces, which is now said to be the one of the most notable examples of night fighting in samurai history. "The result was the complete defeat of the Uesugi forces and the Koga contingent. From that date the Go-Hōjō ("Later-Hōjō") as they were called, went on to further triumphs, beginning with the destruction of the Uesugi family." Despite being vastly outnumbered, the Hōjō army defeated the besiegers because, under Ujiyasu's orders, they were not bulked down by heavy armor and were not slowed by seeking to take heads.

This victory marked the decisive turning point in the struggle for the Kanto, and in the following years, proved the end of the Ōgigayatsu Uesugi line and destroyed the prestige of Uesugi Norimasa of the Yamanouchi Uesugi clan as Kantō kanrei (Governor-General of Kantō region). As a result, many of the Kantō warlords became vassals of the Hōjō clan.

In 1551, Ujiyasu defeated Uesugi Norimasa at Hirai Castle and forced him to flee to Echigo, where he was taken into the protective custody of his retainer Nagao Kagetora, the later day Uesugi Kenshin and heir to Norimasa by adoption.

In 1559, Ujiyasu retired at the age of 45 and Hōjō Ujimasa inherited formal leadership of the family.

In 1561, Kenshin assumed the post of Kantō kanrei and in the same year tried to conquer the region once more. Kenshin besieged Odawara Castle and burned down the town, withdrawing after two months (Siege of Odawara (1561)).

Hōjō expansion

In 1563, Ujiyasu allied himself with Takeda Shingen and regained Matsuyama Castle (松山城) in Musashi Province against Uesugi Norikatsu (上杉憲勝) (Siege of Musashi-Matsuyama (1563)).

In 1564, he took Kōnodai in Shimōsa Province following a battle against Satomi Yoshihiro (里見 義弘) (Battle of Kōnodai (1564)). Following this victory, Ujiyasu pushed on into Shimosa Province and Kazusa Province, but was never able to destroy the Satomi clan, who remained a thorn in the Hôjô's side right up until 1590.

Ujiyasu expanded the Hōjō territory, which now covered five provinces (Sagami, Izu, Musashi, Shimosa and Kazusa), and managed and maintained what his father and grandfather had held. 

Ujiyasu's eastern moves brought the Hōjō into conflict with the Satake clan of Hitachi Province and to the limit of their expansion. After the second battle of Konodai in 1564, the Hōjō largely contented themselves with ruling the vast tracts of land earned through 60 years of war and toil.

Conflict with Takeda
Towards the end of his life Ujiyasu saw the first major conflicts between his own clan and Takeda Shingen (武田 信玄), who would become one of the greatest warlords of the period. 

In 1568, as a response to Hōjō's intervention into his invasion of Suruga Province, Shingen came into Musashi Province from his home province of Kai, attacking Hachigata (鉢形城) (Siege of Hachigata (1568)) and Takiyama (滝山城) Castles, where Ujiyasu's sons repulsed them. 

In 1569, after failing to take the two castles, Shingen nevertheless pressed on to the Hōjō's home castle of Odawara, burning the castle town and withdrawing after three days (Siege of Odawara (1569)). As the forces of Shingen withdrew from repeated failed sieges of Odawara Castle, two of Ujiyasu's seven sons, the brothers Ujiteru and Ujikuni, attacked him in the pass of Mimase (Battle of Mimasetoge), ending the first of the Takeda campaigns against the Hōjō at Sagami province. 

Later in the year, Shingen's son Takeda Katsuyori (武田 勝頼) led a successful siege against the Hojo Kanbara Castle (蒲原城) in Suruga province (Siege of Kanbara). 

Takeda Shingen also laid siege to other Hōjō holdings in the surrounding provinces, including Fukazawa castle (深沢城) in Suruga province which was taken in 1571 (Siege of Fukazawa).

Death
Subsequently, Ujiyasu managed to make peace with Uesugi Kenshin and Takeda Shingen, the most powerful adversaries of Hōjō Ujiyasu, letting his seventh son Hōjō Saburō be adopted by childless Kenshin and accepting the fait accompli of Shingen's reign over Suruga. To cement the ties of Takeda-Imagawa-Hojo, Ujiyasu also gave his two daughters to those two clans; Lady Hayakawa wed to Imagawa Ujizane, while Lady Hojo (Hojo Masako) wed to Takeda Katsuyori becoming his second wife. Ujiyasu died in 1571, passing on the Hōjō domains to his eldest son Ujimasa (北条 氏政) in a relatively favourable situation.

Family
 Father: Hojo Ujitsuna
 Mother: Yojuin-dono
 Wife: Zuikein (d.1590)
 Adopted brother: Hōjō Tsunashige
 Concubines:
 sister of Katsurayama Yasumitsu
 Matsuda-dono
 Children:
 Hojo Shinkuro (1537-1552) by Zuikein
 Lady Hayakawa
 Lady Hojo (1564-1582) married Takeda Katsuyori by Matsuda-dono
 Hōjō Ujimasa by Zuikein
 Jokoin married Ashikaga Yoshiuji and gave birth to Ashikaga Ujinohime.
 Nanamagari-dono married Hojo Ujishige
 Hōjō Ujiteru by Zuikein
 Chorin’in married Ota Ujisuke
 Hōjō Ujikuni by Zuikein
 Ozaki-dono married Chiba Chikatane
 Hōjō Ujinori by Zuikein
 Tanseikuji-dono married Ogasawara Yasuhiro
 Hōjō Ujitada (d.1593)
 Kikuhime married Satomi Yoshiyori
 Hōjō Ujimitsu (d.1590)
 daughter married Chiba Toshitane
 Uesugi Kagetora by sister of Katsurayama Yasumitsu

References

Further reading
Turnbull, Stephen (2002). War in Japan: 1467-1615, Oxford: Osprey Publishing.

Go-Hōjō clan
1515 births
1571 deaths